Lieutenant General Hun Phoeung is the Secretary of State of National Defense, Cambodia. He is the former commander of the royal armed forces.

References

Living people
Government ministers of Cambodia
Year of birth missing (living people)
Place of birth missing (living people)